Foa is a genus of fishes in the family Apogonidae, the cardinalfishes, native to the Indian and Pacific Oceans.

Species
The recognized species in this genus are:
 Foa brachygramma (O. P. Jenkins, 1903)  (weed cardinalfish)
 Foa fo D. S. Jordan & Seale, 1905 (weedy cardinalfish)
 Foa hyalina (H. M. Smith & Radcliffe, 1912) (hyaline cardinalfish) 
 Foa leisi T. H. Fraser & J. E. Randall, 2011 
 Foa longimana M. C. W. Weber, 1909 
 Foa madagascariensis Petit, 1931
 Foa nivosa T. H. Fraser & J. E. Randall, 2011 
 Foa yamba T. H. Fraser, 2014 (Yamba cardinalfish)

References

Apogoninae
Marine fish genera
Taxa named by David Starr Jordan
Taxa named by Barton Warren Evermann